Tatarsky (masculine), Tatarskaya (feminine), or Tatarskoye (neuter) may refer to:
Alexander Tatarsky (1950–2007), Soviet/Russian film director
Tatarsky District, a district of Novosibirsk Oblast, Russia
Tatarsky (inhabited locality) (Tatarskaya, Tatarskoye), name of several rural localities in Russia